James Richard Garoppolo (born November 2, 1991), nicknamed "Jimmy G", is an American football quarterback for the Las Vegas Raiders of the National Football League (NFL). He played college football at Eastern Illinois, where he set the school records for career passing yards and passing touchdowns, and won the Walter Payton Award as a senior. Garoppolo was selected in the second round of the 2014 NFL Draft by the New England Patriots and spent his first four seasons as Tom Brady's backup, being a part of two Super Bowl-winning teams during his tenure. 

Traded to the San Francisco 49ers near the end of the 2017 season, Garoppolo helped revitalize the 1–10 team by winning its five remaining games that year. In 2019, he guided the 49ers to the top seed in the National Football Conference (NFC) and an appearance in Super Bowl LIV. His San Francisco tenure was also afflicted by injuries, which caused him to miss most of the 2018, 2020, and 2022 seasons. In 2023, Garoppolo signed with the Raiders after Derek Carr was released.

Early life and family
Garoppolo was born and raised in Arlington Heights, Illinois. He is the third of four sons born to Denise (née Malec) and Tony Garoppolo Sr., a retired electrician. His older brothers are Tony Garoppolo Jr., an architect; and Mike Garoppolo, a teacher, and his younger brother is Billy Garoppolo. He is from a "tight-knit, big Italian family"; his paternal grandparents, Anthony and Rose Garoppolo, were both Italian immigrants, while his maternal grandparents, Theodore J. Malec and Harriet D. Seidel, were of Polish and German descent, respectively.

He attended Rolling Meadows High School in Rolling Meadows, where he was a quarterback and linebacker for the Mustangs football team. He played in 19 games at quarterback during his junior and senior seasons, and passed for 3,136 yards and 25 touchdowns. In addition to football, Garoppolo was a pitcher for Rolling Meadows High School, stating that "Baseball was my first love when I was a little kid." A 2-star recruit, Garoppolo accepted an offer to play football at Eastern Illinois over offers from Illinois State and Montana State.

College career
Garoppolo played football for the Eastern Illinois Panthers from 2010 to 2013. In his first year, he started eight games, passing for 1,639 yards and 14 touchdowns and earning All-Ohio Valley Conference Newcomer Team honors playing under head coach Bob Spoo. He went on to start every remaining game during his time at Eastern Illinois, passing for 2,644 yards and 20 touchdowns in 2011, 3,823 yards and 31 touchdowns in 2012, and 5,050 yards and 53 touchdowns in 2013, breaking the school record for career pass completions previously held by former Dallas Cowboys quarterback Tony Romo.

In 2013, Garoppolo, playing his senior season in head coach Dino Babers's uptempo no-huddle offense, won the Walter Payton Award, given to the most outstanding offensive player in the Division I Football Championship Subdivision. He was also named the 2013–14 OVC Male Athlete of the Year and the 2013 College Football Performance FCS National Quarterback of the Year.

College statistics

Professional career

NFL Draft 

Represented by Don Yee, Garoppolo was considered one of the better quarterback prospects for the 2014 NFL Draft. The New England Patriots drafted him in the second round of the 2014 NFL Draft as the 62nd overall pick. He was the first player from the Football Championship Subdivision drafted in 2014, and the highest-drafted quarterback the Patriots had selected since Drew Bledsoe was picked first overall in 1993. Garoppolo and the Patriots signed a four-year contract worth $3,483,898 ($1,103,744 guaranteed) with an $853,744 signing bonus.

New England Patriots
2014 season

In 2014, Garoppolo made his regular season debut in the fourth quarter of the Patriots' Week 4 41–14 road loss to the Kansas City Chiefs. He led the Patriots on a scoring drive, which led to his first career passing touchdown on a 13-yard pass to tight end Rob Gronkowski on his first drive. He finished the game completing six of seven passes for 70 yards and one touchdown, with a passer rating of 147.9.

In his rookie season, Garoppolo played in six games. He completed 19 of 27 passes for 182 yards and a touchdown with a 101.2 passer rating and had 10 rushing attempts for 9 yards. While Garoppolo did not take any snaps in the Patriots' Super Bowl XLIX victory, he was credited with helping to prepare the Patriots' defense for Seattle Seahawks quarterback Russell Wilson.

2015 season

In 2015, Garoppolo appeared in five games in relief roles. He completed one of four passes for six yards on the season for a 39.6 passer rating.

2016 season

After starting quarterback Tom Brady was suspended by the league for four games for Deflategate, head coach Bill Belichick named Garoppolo the starting quarterback for the first game of the 2016 season, and he was expected to stand in for Brady for all four games. Garoppolo completed 24 of 33 passes for 264 yards and a touchdown in a 23–21 Week 1 victory over the Arizona Cardinals. He threw for 234 yards and three touchdowns in Week 2 against the Miami Dolphins before being sidelined with a shoulder injury in the second quarter of the 31–24 victory. He sprained his AC joint after a hit by Dolphins' linebacker Kiko Alonso that kept him out the next two games, giving the starting job to rookie Jacoby Brissett before Brady returned from his suspension in Week 5. In Super Bowl LI, while active for the Patriots' 34–28 overtime victory over the Atlanta Falcons; he was the only Patriot who did not play in the game.

2017 season

During the offseason, Garoppolo was the subject of several trade rumors with the Chicago Bears and Cleveland Browns being cited most commonly as potential suitors. Ultimately, no trade occurred and Garoppolo remained with the Patriots going into the season.

San Francisco 49ers

2017 season

On October 31, 2017, the Patriots traded Garoppolo to the San Francisco 49ers in exchange for the 49ers' second-round pick in the 2018 NFL Draft. He made his 49ers debut on November 26 in the final minute of the 49ers' Week 12 game against the Seattle Seahawks, taking his first snaps of the season after starter C. J. Beathard suffered an injury. On his first play as a 49er, he rushed for six yards; on the final play of the game, he threw a 10-yard touchdown to Louis Murphy. He finished the 24–13 loss completing both pass attempts for 18 yards and a touchdown.

On November 28, 2017, Garoppolo was named the starter for the 49ers' Week 13 game against the Chicago Bears. Making his first start for the 49ers on December 3, 2017, Garoppolo finished with 293 passing yards and an interception as the 49ers won 15–14. He recorded 334 passing yards, one touchdown, and one interception in a 26–16 victory over the Houston Texans in Week 14. In the next game against the Tennessee Titans, he had a season-high 381 passing yards and a touchdown in a close 25–23 win. In Week 16 against the Jacksonville Jaguars, he had 242 passing yards, two touchdowns, one interception, and his first career rushing touchdown in the 44–33 victory. In the regular season finale against the Los Angeles Rams, who were resting most defensive starters to prepare for the playoffs, he accumulated 292 passing yards, two touchdowns, and two interceptions in a 34–13 blowout 49ers' win. His victories in Weeks 13–17 gave him a 7–0 record in his first seven starts (including his two starts for New England), making him the first quarterback to do so since Ben Roethlisberger accomplished the same feat in 2004. With Garoppolo under center, the 49ers scored on 62 percent of their offensive drives, 11 percent more than the second-place New England Patriots. For perspective, NFL teams scored on 35 percent of their drives in 2017, and the 49ers scored on just 29 percent of their 2017 drives without Garoppolo. Garoppolo finished the 2017 season with 1,560 passing yards, seven passing touchdowns, five interceptions, 11 rushing yards, and one rushing touchdown.

Because Garoppolo was on the Patriots' roster for eight games before he was traded to the 49ers, an NFC team, he was eligible for payments from the league based on the Patriots' playoff performance; because the Patriots reached Super Bowl LII, he earned $107,000.

On February 8, 2018, the 49ers and Garoppolo agreed to terms on a 5-year contract worth a maximum of $137.5 million. At the time of its signing, it was the largest contract in NFL history on an annual basis, surpassing that of Detroit Lions quarterback Matthew Stafford. It also had nearly $90 million in guarantees in the first three years, also the largest total in NFL history at the time.

On April 30, 2018, his peers voted him as the 90th best player in the league on the NFL Top 100 Players of 2018.

2018 season

During Week 3 game against the Kansas City Chiefs, Garoppolo finished with 251 passing yards for two touchdowns before leaving the game with a left knee injury. It was later revealed he tore his ACL, prematurely ending his season. With Garoppolo sidelined, the 49ers went on to finish with a 4–12 record.

2019 season

Garoppolo returned from his injury in time for the 49ers' season opener against the Tampa Bay Buccaneers. In the game, he threw for 166 yards, one touchdown, and one interception in the 31–17 win. In the next game against the Cincinnati Bengals, Garoppolo threw for 297 yards, three touchdowns, and an interception as the 49ers won 41–17. On Thursday Night Football in Week 9 against the Arizona Cardinals, Garoppolo threw for 317 yards and four touchdowns as the 49ers won 28–25. In Week 10 against the Seattle Seahawks, Garoppolo threw for 248 yards, a touchdown, and an interception as the 49ers lost 27–24 in overtime. The next week against the Arizona Cardinals, Garoppolo threw for 424 yards, four touchdowns, and two interceptions as the 49ers won 36–26. In Week 12, against the Green Bay Packers, he passed for 253 yards and two touchdowns in the 37–8 victory. In Week 14 against the New Orleans Saints, Garoppolo threw for 349 yards, four touchdowns, and one interception in the 48–46 win, earning him NFC Offensive Player of the Week. In Week 17, against the Seattle Seahawks, he was 18-of-22 for 285 yards with no touchdowns or interceptions in the 26–21 victory, which clinched the NFC West and home-field advantage throughout the NFC playoffs for the 49ers. He finished the 2019 season with 3,978 passing yards, 27 touchdowns, and 13 interceptions. Garoppolo was the runner-up for NFL Comeback Player of the Year, finishing one vote behind Titans quarterback Ryan Tannehill.

In the Divisional Round of the playoffs against the Minnesota Vikings, Garoppolo threw for 131 yards, one touchdown, and one interception during the 27–10 win. Hampered by a knee injury, Garoppolo attempted only eight passes in the 37–20 NFC Championship victory over the Green Bay Packers, the fewest in a postseason game since Bob Griese in Super Bowl VIII, completing six for 77 yards. In Super Bowl LIV against the Kansas City Chiefs in Miami, Florida, Garoppolo threw 31 passes, completing 20 for 219 yards, one touchdown and two interceptions during the 31–20 loss. His team was up by ten points with seven minutes remaining in the game but the Chiefs later scored 21 points in five minutes to win the game. He was ranked 43rd by his fellow players on the NFL Top 100 Players of 2019.

2020 season

In the 49ers' Week 1 game against the Arizona Cardinals, Garoppolo threw for 259 yards and two touchdowns in the 24–20 loss. The next week against the New York Jets, Garoppolo threw for 131 yards and two touchdowns before exiting the game following the first half with an ankle sprain and replaced by Nick Mullens. He missed the next two games against the New York Giants and Philadelphia Eagles before returning to the starting lineup in Week 5 against the Miami Dolphins. During the game, Garoppolo completed 7 passes out of 17 attempts for 77 yards and two interceptions before being benched in favor of C. J. Beathard at halftime. The 49ers wound up losing 43–17. Head coach Kyle Shanahan said after the game that he benched Garoppolo because he was concerned he wasn't fully recovered and didn't want his injury aggravated. In the following week's game against the Los Angeles Rams, Garoppolo threw for 268 yards and 3 touchdowns during the 24–16 win.

In Week 7 against his former team, the New England Patriots, Garoppolo threw for 277 yards and two interceptions during the 33–6 win. In Week 8 against the Seattle Seahawks, Garoppolo completed 11 of 16 passes for only 84 yards and an interception before injuring his ankle and leaving in the 4th quarter being replaced by Mullens. The 49ers lost 37–27. The next day, it was announced that Garoppolo would be out indefinitely due to him re-aggravating his high ankle sprain. On November 5, 2020, Garoppolo was placed on injured reserve. He was designated to return from injured reserve on December 22, and began practicing with the team again, but the 49ers did not activate him before the end of the season.

2021 season

Garoppolo would start the 2021 season over the third overall pick Trey Lance. In Week 1 against the Detroit Lions, Garoppolo threw for 314 yards and a touchdown while losing a fumble in a 41–33 victory. In Week 3 against the Green Bay Packers, Garoppolo threw for 254 yards, two touchdowns, and an interception while again losing a fumble in a 30–28 loss. In Week 4 against the Seattle Seahawks, Garoppolo threw for 165 yards, a touchdown, and an interception before leaving in the second half due to a calf injury. The 49ers would lose 28–21 and Garoppolo would miss the Week 5 against the Arizona Cardinals as well. In Week 8 against the Chicago Bears, Garoppolo had two rushing touchdowns to go along with 322 yards passing in a 33–22 victory. In Week 18 against the Los Angeles Rams, Garoppolo threw for 316 yards, a touchdown, and two interceptions, but helped the 49ers rally from being down 17–3 at halftime and won 27–24 in overtime, sending the team to the playoffs. Garoppolo played in 15 games, missing two games due to injury, threw for 3,810 yards, 20 touchdowns, 12 interceptions, and rushed for three additional touchdowns as the 49ers finished the regular season with a 10–7 record.

In the Wild Card Round of the playoffs against the Dallas Cowboys, Garoppolo threw for 172 yards and an interception in the 23–17 win. In the Divisional Round, Garoppolo threw for 131 yards and an interception en route to a 13–10 upset win over the favored Green Bay Packers. In the NFC Championship against the Los Angeles Rams, Garoppolo threw for 232 yards and two touchdowns, but threw a costly interception to Travin Howard in the final two minutes in the 20–17 loss.

2022 season 

During training camp former backup quarterback Trey Lance was named the starter over Garoppolo for the 2022 season. Garoppolo and the 49ers agreed to a one-year contract to keep him with the team. As part of the contract, he had a fully guaranteed base salary of $6.5 million.

During Week 2 against the Seattle Seahawks, Garoppolo came into the game in the first quarter after Lance left the game with a broken ankle. Garoppolo threw for 154 yards, a touchdown, and rushed for an additional touchdown in the 27–7 win. After the game, it was revealed Lance's injury was season-ending, allowing Garoppolo to retake the starting role for the remainder of the season. During the Week 3 matchup against the Denver Broncos, Garoppolo stepped out of the back of the end zone, committing a safety. In Week 7 against the Kansas City Chiefs, Garoppolo went for 25-of-37 passes with 303 passing yards, 2 passing touchdowns, and one interception in 44–23 loss. In the next game, Garoppolo threw 21 completions of 25 attempts for 235 yards and two touchdowns with a 132.5 passer rating in a 31–14 win against the rival Los Angeles Rams. In Week 13 against the Miami Dolphins, Garoppolo injured his foot in the first quarter and was initially expected to undergo surgery, which would end his season. Rookie Brock Purdy led the team to a 33–17 victory after. However, on December 6, 2022, it was reported by ESPN that Garoppolo did not suffer a Lisfranc foot injury, and had a return timetable of 7-8 weeks. Ultimately, Garoppolo did not return for the remainder of the season. Without him, the 49ers finished the season with a 13–4 record, but lost to the Philadelphia Eagles in the NFC Championship Game after injuries to both Purdy and Josh Johnson.

Las Vegas Raiders

2023 season 
On March 17, 2023, Garoppolo signed a three-year, $67.5 million contract with the Las Vegas Raiders.

NFL career statistics

Regular season

Postseason

References

External links

 
 
 San Francisco 49ers bio
 Eastern Illinois Panthers bio

1991 births
Living people
American football quarterbacks
American people of German descent
American people of Italian descent
American people of Polish descent
Eastern Illinois Panthers football players
Las Vegas Raiders players
New England Patriots players
People from Arlington Heights, Illinois
Players of American football from Illinois
San Francisco 49ers players
Sportspeople from Cook County, Illinois
Walter Payton Award winners